Native aluminium (IMA1980-085a) is a natural occurrence of aluminium metal. Its (co)-type localities are the Billeekh intrusion and the dike OB-255, Sakha Republic.

In the a gabbro-dolerite of the Billeekh intrusion it occurs with copper, zinc, tin, lead, cadmium, iron, antimony and moissanite. In the occurrence in the Tolbachik volcano in Russia it occurs with magnetite, ilmenite, hematite, pyrite and native iron. In the Getang, Guizhou Province, China, occurrence it occurs with copper, sulfur and jarosite.

References

Minerals in space group 225
Native element minerals
Aluminium
Cubic minerals